Dilg is a surname. Notable people with the surname include:

John Dilg (born 1945), American painter
Joseph Dilg (1878–1953), American wrestler

See also
Herbert A. Dilg House